Crispin Gallagher Sartwell (born 1958) is an American academic, philosopher, and journalist who is a faculty member of the philosophy department at Dickinson College in Carlisle, Pennsylvania. He has taught philosophy, communication, and political science at a number of schools, including Vanderbilt University, University of Alabama, Millersville University of Pennsylvania, the Maryland Institute College of Art, and Dickinson College.

Early life and education
Born in Washington, D.C., Sartwell is the son of Franklin Gallagher Sartwell, a reporter, editor, and photographer. His grandfather, also Franklin Gallagher Sartwell, was a columnist and editorial page editor at the Washington Times-Herald. His great-grandfather, Herman Bernstein broke the story of a secret correspondence between Kaiser Wilhelm and Nicholas II of Russia during World War I in The New York Times. Sartwell worked as a freelance rock critic for publications, including Record and Melody Maker.

His mother, Joyce Abell, and stepfather, Richard Abell, were teachers in Montgomery County, Maryland and organic vegetable farmers in Rappahannock County, Virginia.

Sartwell received a Bachelor of Arts degree from the University of Maryland, College Park, a Master of Arts from Johns Hopkins University and a PhD from the University of Virginia, where his dissertation supervisor was Richard Rorty. Sartwell wrote his dissertation on art and articulation, discussing pictorial representation in John Dewey, Martin Heidegger, Nelson Goodman, and Hans-Georg Gadamer.

Career
A journalist since he was 20, Sartwell's syndicated column, distributed by Creators Syndicate, appeared in numerous newspapers through the 1990s and 2000s, including The Philadelphia Inquirer and Los Angeles Times. He has continued to write for the popular press, with work appearing in the New York Times as a contributing writer to the Times's philosophy section, The Stone. He has been published in The Atlantic, Harper's Bazaar, The Washington Post, All Things Considered and other venues. He has appeared on Washington Journal, discussing political philosophy and ethics. Sartwell remains actively involved in music criticism, including writing a country music column for the New York Press.

Sartwell is a regular contributor to the webzine Splice Today.

From 1989 through 1993, Sartwell was an Andrew W. Mellon Postdoctoral Fellow at Vanderbilt University. From 1995 to 1996, Sartwell was an Annenberg Scholar in the Annenberg School for Communication at the University of Pennsylvania,.

Sartwell is best known as a political philosopher, with significant interests in analytic philosophy, aesthetics, and epistemology. As a political philosopher, he has been an advocate of anarchism and individual rights as opposed to the rights of the state. In his 2008 work, Against the State: An Introduction to Anarchist Political Philosophy, he refuted the traditional justifications for the state from Hobbes through Nozick. This was followed by his 2010 work, Political Aesthetics, in which he evaluated various systems based on the assumption that political systems are in part aesthetic systems.

Sartwell's interest in language as a system and its constraints and problems has been a constant in his career. Perhaps his clearest expression of this was in his 2000 publication, End of Story: Toward an Annihilation of Language and History, which posited an academic obsession with language qua language and narrative at the expense of a better conceptual and open dialogue.

As a philosopher of aesthetics as well as of language, Sartwell has seen the issues of beauty as being a constant in the search for meaning. His 2014 book How to Escape: Magic, Madness, Beauty and Cynicism, looked at a wide variety of artistic expressions and experiences from an aesthetics perspective. This followed his previous work, 2004's Six Names of Beauty, in which he used different words for beauty in a variety of languages including Greek, Sanskrit, Japanese, and Navajo as a gateway to understanding the cultural diversity and similarities between ideas and manifestations of beauty. Later books include Entanglements: A System of Philosophy (2017) and Beauty: A Quick Immersion (2022).

On March 3, 2016, Sartwell was placed on leave from his faculty position at Dickinson College in response to posts on his blog in which he accused other philosophy professors of plagiarism. According to Sartwell, the action is related to a video, embedded in the blog post, of Miranda Lambert singing "Time to Get a Gun." Additional problematic material was found on his blog, but given little to no mind by the college's administration. In September, 2016, The Dickinsonian reported that Sartwell had returned to his position and would resume teaching in the spring of 2017.

Works 
The Art of Living: Aesthetics of the Ordinary in World Spiritual Traditions. Albany: SUNY, 1995.
Obscenity, Anarchy, Reality. Albany: SUNY, 1996.
Act Like You Know: African-American Autobiography and White Identity. Chicago, University of Chicago Press, 1998.
End of Story: Toward an Annihilation of Language and History. Albany: SUNY, 2000.
Extreme Virtue: Leadership and Truth in Five Great American Lives. Albany: SUNY, 2003.
Six Names of Beauty. New York: Routledge, 2004.
Exquisite Rebel: The Essays of Voltairine de Cleyre — Anarchist, Feminist, Genius (Co-edited with Sharon Presley). Albany: SUNY, 2005.
Against the State: An Introduction to Anarchist Political Theory. Albany: SUNY, 2008.
Political Aesthetics. Ithaca: Cornell UP, 2010.
Editor, The Practical Anarchist: Writings of Josiah Warren. New York: Fordham, 2011.
How to Escape: Magic, Madness, Beauty, and Cynicism. Albany: SUNY, 2014.
Entanglements: A System of Philosophy. Albany: SUNY Press, 2017. 
Beauty: A Quick Immersion. New York: Tibidabo Publishing, Inc., 2022.
In addition to his major publications, Sartwell has published over 40 professional articles in a variety of academic journals including the British Journal of Aesthetics, Philosophy Today, American Philosophical Quarterly and others.

Articles

See also

Anarchism in the United States
American philosophy
List of American philosophers

References

External links
 Eye of the Storm, Crispin Sartwell's blog, hosted on blogs.com.
Audio/video media
, "American Philosopher", June 27, 2007.
, "ReasonTV", January 13, 2009.

1958 births
Living people
American philosophers
American anarchists
Individualist anarchists
American columnists
University of Maryland, College Park alumni
Johns Hopkins University alumni
University of Virginia alumni
Dickinson College faculty